Stephen Jacob Jimbangan is a Malaysian politician from Sabah region and the former Parti Gagasan Rakyat Sabah candidate for the State Legislative Assembly (DUN) N25 Kapayan, Sabah in the 14th Malaysian General Election (GE). He is the former Secretary General of the Parti Gagasan Rakyat Sabah and holds the position of 2nd president for Parti Gagasan Rakyat Sabah before being taken over by Hajiji Noor. In 2023, he was appointed as Deputy Secretary General for the Parti Gagasan Rakyat Sabah with the party's Secretary General Mohd Razali Razi.

Election results

References

Members of the Sabah State Legislative Assembly
Living people
1969 births